Petar "Pece" Naumoski (born 27 August 1968) is a former Macedonian professional basketball player. At a height of 1.95 m (6'4 ") tall, and a weight of 95 kg (210 lbs.). He played mainly at the point guard position during his career, but he could also play as a shooting guard and a small forward. He was a very skillful play maker. In his pro playing career, he had some quite successful years, while playing in Turkey and Italy.

Professional playing career
In his career, Naumoski won all of the 3 different European-wide professional club basketball leagues that existed while he was playing. He won the championship of the top-tier level European-wide league, the EuroLeague, two times. With the Yugoslavian League club Split, in the 1989–90 season, and the 1990–91 season.

He also won the championship of the secondary level European-wide league, the FIBA Saporta Cup, with the Italian League club Treviso Basket, in the 1994–95 season. He won the Saporta Cup again, with the Italian club Mens Sana Basket, in the 2001–02 season. In addition, he also won the championship of the third-tier level European-wide league, the FIBA Korać Cup, with the Turkish Super League club Efes, in the 1995–96 season.

He was a three time FIBA EuroStar, in the years 1996, 1997, and 1998.

Macedonian national team
Naumoski was a member of the senior men's Macedonian national basketball team. With Macedonia, he played at the 1999 EuroBasket.

Post playing career
Naumoski once served as the Sport Minister of the Republic of North Macedonia. In June 2007, some Turkish newspapers claimed that Efes Pilsen was considering Naumoski to be their new head basketball coach of the club, to replace Oktay Mahmuti. However, the Turkish club ultimately opted to hire David Blatt instead.

On 27 April 2015, he was named the President of the Basketball Federation of Macedonia. On 9 February 2017, Efes retired his number 7 jersey.

Personal
Naumoski also has a Turkish passport, under the name of Namık Polat, as well as Italian citizenship.

Awards and honours
 With Jugoplastika/POP 84 Split
 2× Yugoslavian Cup Winner: (1990, 1991)
 2× FIBA European Champions Cup (EuroLeague) Champion: (1990, 1991)
 2× Yugoslavian Federal League Champion: (1990, 1991)
 With Efes Pilsen
 4× Turkish President's Cup (Turkish Supercup) Winner: (1992, 1993, 1996, 1998)
 FIBA European Cup Runner-up: (1993)
 4× Turkish Super League Champion: (1993, 1994, 1996, 1997)
 4× Turkish Cup Winner: (1994, 1996, 1997, 1998)
 FIBA Korać Cup Champion: (1996)
 With Benetton Treviso
 Italian Cup Winner: (1995)
 FIBA European Cup Champion: (1995)
 With Montepaschi Siena
 FIBA Saporta Cup Champion: (2002)
 With Ülkerspor
 Turkish Cup Winner: (2004)
 Turkish President's Cup (Turkish Supercup) Winner: (2004)
 With MZT Skopje
 Macedonian Cup Runner-up: (2011)

References

External links

Official website
Euroleague.net Profile
FIBA Archive Profile
FIBA Europe Profile
Italian League Profile 
TBLStat.net Profile

1968 births
Living people
Anadolu Efes S.K. players
Italian men's basketball players
KK MZT Skopje players
KK Rabotnički players
KK Split players
Macedonian men's basketball players
Mens Sana Basket players
Naturalized citizens of Turkey
Olimpia Milano players
Pallacanestro Treviso players
Sportspeople from Prilep
Point guards
Shooting guards
Small forwards
Turkish men's basketball players
Ülker G.S.K. basketball players
Yugoslav men's basketball players